The former Newport Odeon, currently trading as The NEON, is a large Grade II listed building in the city of Newport, South Wales.

It is located at the junction of Clarence Place and Chepstow Road on the east side of Newport city centre, near Newport Bridge. The building is one of the few true examples of Art Deco architecture in Newport.

History 
It was opened in March 1938 as an Odeon cinema, designed by Harry Weedon. The cinema closed in 1981, fell derelict in the following years and was facing the possibility of demolition. It became Grade II listed in 1999.

Subsequent ownership
After many years of the ground floor being used as snooker hall, the building was bought by a local business-owning couple in 2003 and was transformed at a cost of over £1 million and renamed Newport City Live Arena. Features included a huge television screen to show live sporting events and a stage that hosted several famous music acts.

The building was sold, redeveloped and opened in February 2016 as a live music and vintage movie venue and named The NEON (Newport Entertains Our Nation). The name is a play on the original Odeon name (Oscar Deutsch Entertains Our Nation). The business is owned and run by English businessmen Ian Gilland and Andrew James Byers.

Political events 
In 2019 the venue sold out to over 1,000 people for a rally of the Brexit Party, with figures including Nigel Farage, Ann Widdecombe, Nathan Gill and James Wells speaking to supporters ahead of the 2019 European Parliament elections.

References

See also
Odeon Newport, history at cinematreasures
The Neon - Newport's favourite entertainment venue

Art Deco architecture in Wales
Culture in Newport, Wales
Grade II listed buildings in Newport, Wales
Landmarks in Newport, Wales
Theatres completed in 1938
Music venues in Newport, Wales
Grade II listed theatres
Newport, Wales